206th may refer to:

206th (Canadien-Français) Battalion, CEF, a unit in the Canadian Expeditionary Force during the First World War
206th Combat Communications Squadron (206 CBCS), an Air National Guard combat communications unit located at Elmendorf AFB, Alaska
206th Field Artillery Regiment (United States), a United States artillery regiment Headquartered at Russellville, Arkansas. T
206th Infantry Division (Germany), a military unit that served during World War II

See also
206 (number)
206, the year 206 (CCVI) of the Julian calendar